A tropical rainforest climate or equatorial climate is a tropical climate sub-type usually found within 10 to 15 degrees latitude of the equator. There are some other areas at higher latitudes, such as the coast of southeast Florida, USA, and Okinawa, Japan that fall into the tropical rainforest climate category.   They experience high mean annual temperatures, small temperature ranges, and rain that falls throughout the year. Regions with this climate are typically designated Af by the Köppen climate classification. A tropical rainforest climate is typically hot, very humid, and wet.

Description

Tropical rain forests have a type of tropical climate in which there is no dry season—all months have an average precipitation value of at least . There are no distinct wet or dry seasons as rainfall is high throughout the months. One day in a tropical rainforest climate can be very similar to the next, while the change in temperature between day and night may be larger than the average change in temperature during the year.

Equatorial climates and tropical trade-wind climates 
When tropical rainforest climates are more dominated by the Intertropical Convergence Zone (ITCZ) than the trade winds (and with no or rare cyclones), so usually located near the equator, they are also called equatorial climates. Otherwise, when they are more dominated by the trade winds than the ITCZ, they are called tropical trade-wind climates. In pure equatorial climates, the atmospheric pressure is almost constantly low so the horizontal pressure gradient is low. Consequently, the winds are rare and usually weak (except sea and land breezes in coastal areas) while in tropical trade-wind climates, often located at higher latitudes than the equatorial climates, wind is almost permanent which incidentally explains why rainforest formations are impoverished compared to those of equatorial climates due to their necessary resistance to strong winds accompanying tropical disturbances.

Cities with tropical rainforest climates
<div float="left">

Asia
 Batang, Indonesia
 Palembang, Indonesia 
 Medan, Indonesia 
 Balikpapan, Indonesia (equatorial climate)
 Padang, Indonesia (equatorial climate)
 Pontianak, Indonesia (equatorial climate)
 Ishigaki, Japan
 Johor Bahru, Malaysia (equatorial climate)
 Kandy, Sri Lanka
 Kuala Lumpur, Malaysia (equatorial climate)
 Kuching, Malaysia (equatorial climate)
 George Town, Malaysia
 Ipoh, Malaysia
 Davao City, Philippines 
 Polomolok, Philippines 
 Tacloban, Leyte, Philippines
 Singapore (equatorial climate)
 Kurunegala, Sri Lanka
 Sri Jayawardenepura Kotte, Sri Lanka 
 Orchid Island, Taiwan
 Nakhon Si Thammarat, Thailand

Oceania
 Pago Pago, American Samoa
 Innisfail, Queensland, Australia
 Palikir, Federated States of Micronesia
 Suva, Fiji
 Hanga Roa, Easter Island, Chile
 Hagåtña, Guam
 Tarawa, Kiribati
 Majuro, Marshall Islands
 Tabubil, Papua New Guinea (equatorial climate)
 Lae, Papua New Guinea (equatorial climate)
 Apia, Samoa
 Honiara, Solomon Islands
 Nuku’alofa, Tonga
 Funafuti, Tuvalu
 Hilo, Hawaii, United States
 Port Vila, Vanuatu

Africa
 Moroni, Comoros
 Kisumu, Kenya
 Harper, Liberia (equatorial climate)
 Antalaha, Madagascar
 Manakara, Madagascar
 Kampala, Uganda
 Toamasina, Madagascar

Americas
 Lelydorp, Suriname
 Punta Gorda, Belize
 Limón, Costa Rica
 Higüey, Dominican Republic
 Puerto Barrios, Guatemala
 La Ceiba, Honduras
 Port Antonio, Jamaica
 Bluefields, Nicaragua
 Changuinola, Panama
 West Palm Beach, Florida, United States 
 Fort Lauderdale, Florida, United States
 Belém, Brazil (equatorial climate)
 Macaé, Brazil
 Scarborough, Trinidad and Tobago
 Salvador, Brazil
 Florencia, Colombia
 Puyo, Ecuador (equatorial climate)
 Saint-Laurent-du-Maroni, French Guiana (equatorial climate)
 Georgetown, Guyana
 Iquitos, Peru (equatorial climate)
 Paramaribo, Suriname (equatorial climate)
 Buenaventura, Valle del Cauca, Colombia (equatorial climate)
 Leticia, Colombia (equatorial climate)

See also
 Tropics
 Monsoon climate
 Tropical savanna climate
 Köppen climate classification

References

Köppen climate types
Rainforests
Tropical and subtropical moist broadleaf forests
Tropical rainforests
Climate, Rainforest